Laak, officially the Municipality of Laak, is a 1st class municipality in the province of Davao de Oro, Philippines. According to the 2020 census, it has a population of 79,744 people.

History
The town of Laak was founded on April 4, 1979, as San Vicente from several barangays of Monkayo, Montevista and Asuncion. Laak was created into a municipality by virtue of Batas Pambansa Bilang 23. It was made part of the newly made Compostela Valley province in 1998. The original name that the pioneer residents used to call this place even before the very formation of its nucleus in 1965 is no other than the native name Laak, derived from the name of a small thorn less bamboo. It is similar to but smaller than the bamboo called Lunas by the Bisayan tribes.

The name Laak, however, was not adopted when this place was created into a municipality. The name San Vicente was instantly coined just to insure the passage of the law creating this place into a town. The term San was attached to the name Vicente after the name of the father of then First Lady Imelda Romualdez Marcos. Coincidentally, the law creating this town was approved on the eve of the feast day of Sr. San Vicente Ferrer.

As the town residents found no meaning in calling this place San Vicente, they unanimously approved during the plebiscite called for the purpose on May 28, 1994, the adoption of the name Laak. Mayor Reynaldo B. Navarro, and the Sangguniang Bayan Members at that time led the move for the change of the name pursuant to the desire of the people.

Geography
Laak, although it has an overall population of 70,856 in per census of 2010, is very isolated from other populated towns in its vicinity such as Monkayo and Nabunturan. The main cause of this is of its being a predominantly agricultural town; there are also some factors which contribute to its isolation such as its huge land area of 947.06 km2.(94, 706 hectares) and its heavily forested geographical features.

The municipality borders Municipality of Kapalong, Davao del Norte, to the west; Province of Agusan del Sur to the north; Municipality of Montevista and Monkayo, Davao de Oro, to the southeast; and Municipality of San Isidro, Davao del Norte, to the south-west.

Climate

Barangays
Laak is politically subdivided into 40 barangays.

Demographics

Economy

Laak's economy is primarily driven by agriculture, with almost 65% of its income coming from agricultural sector (it includes agro-forestry, inland fishery and livestock raising) and business enterprises contribute only 35% of the municipality's income.

Transportation
The town of Laak is accessible by bus, passenger jeeps, and habal-habal motorcycles from both Tagum City and Trento, Agusan del Sur. Most passenger vehicles going to Laak had to pass the Tagum-Asuncion-San Isidro-Laak road since this road is one of the only two transportation accesses to the town, the other one being Loreto-Veruela-Trento road; the town does not have roads connecting to other towns of Davao de Oro, such as Nabunturan and Monkayo.

See also
List of renamed cities and municipalities in the Philippines

References

External links
 Laak Profile at the DTI Cities and Municipalities Competitive Index
 [ Philippine Standard Geographic Code]
Philippine Census Information

Municipalities of Davao de Oro